Parliamentary elections were held in the Federated States of Micronesia on 8 March 2011, alongside a three-part referendum. As there were no political parties, all 34 candidates ran as independents. For the first time in the country's history, two women ran for election, both in Chuuk State. However, neither was elected.

The three referendum questions were held on extending the congressional term length to four years for all members (at the time, 10 of the 14 members were only elected for two-year terms), allowing the holding of dual citizenship, and whether a Constitutional Convention should be elected to revise the constitution. Only the latter proposal was approved. However, the convention didn't get elected.

Electoral system
The 14 seats in Congress consist of 10 seats elected every two years, and four "at large" seats elected every four years. The 2011 election was one in which all 14 seats were up for election. Around 92,000 voters registered for the elections.

Two of the referendum questions, on congressional term lengths and dual citizenship, involved amending the constitution. In order to pass, they required the approval of at least 75% of voters in at least three of the four states. The third referendum on calling a Constitutional Convention is required every ten years by article 2 of Chapter XIV of the constitution, and required only a simple majority at the national level.

Campaign
President Manny Mori was challenged by Anna Asauo Wengu, one of the two women candidates. He promised to increase the amount of foreign investment in order to develop the country's fishing industry, as well as campaigning on the importance of connecting the four states by fibre optic cable. He also promised to focus on education, including the provision of financial assistance for post-graduates.

The other female candidate, Augustina Takashy, ran against Joe Suka, the leader of the Floor in Congress. She campaigned on investing in job creation and ensuring that basic social services were affordable to all, as well as promising to work on gender issues.

Constitutional changes
The two referendum questions involving changing the constitution would have altered chapters III, IX and X of the document.

Term length amendments

Dual citizenship amendment
The dual citizenship amendment would be achieved by removing article 3 of Chapter III:

Results

Congress

|-
! style="background-color:#E9E9E9;text-align:left;vertical-align:top;" width=450|Members
! style="background-color:#E9E9E9;text-align:right;" |Seats
|-
| style="text-align:left;" |Non-partisans
| style="text-align:right;" |14
|-
|style="text-align:left;background-color:#E9E9E9"|Total (turnout  %)
|width="30" style="text-align:right;background-color:#E9E9E9"|14
|}

Referendums

Four year term of office for all Congress members

Lifting the ban on dual citizenship

Calling a Constitutional Convention

Presidential election 
An indirect election to elect the president was held in the Federated States of Micronesia on 11 May 2011, following the parliamentary election on 8 March 2011. Incumbent president Manny Mori was reelected.

References

Elections in the Federated States of Micronesia
2011 elections in Oceania
Parliamentary election
Non-partisan elections
2011 referendums
Referendums in the Federated States of Micronesia